Captain Elechi Amadi Polytechnic (formerly known as Rivers State School of Basic Studies, Rivers State College of Arts and Science and later Port Harcourt Polytechnic ) is a polytechnic funded by the Government of Rivers State, located in Port Harcourt, Rivers State, Nigeria.

Port Harcourt Polytechnic was renamed changed to Captain Elechi Amadi Polytechnic by the Governor of Rivers State, Nyesom Ezenwo Wike CON, signed the Port Harcourt Polytechnic Bill into law on 4 July 2016.   

All the provisions of the said Law now form the Captain Elechi Amadi Polytechnic Law.

History
The school originated on 19 April 1984 when the military governor of the state, Police Commissioner Fidelis Oyakhilome, signed the edict establishing Rivers State School of Basic Studies. The edict took effect in November 1987 when the school started operating as a tertiary institution affiliated to the University of Ibadan. Later it was affiliated to the Ahmadu Bello University, Zaria for pre-degree IJMB (Interim Joint Matriculation Board) courses.

In 1999, the school was restructured as the Rivers State College of Arts and Science with the mandate to offer courses leading to award of Diplomas and certificates in various disciplines besides school certificates and IJMB. The college had three schools: Arts, Science and Preliminary Studies and the Institute of Continuing Education.

In 2006, the National Board for Technical Education (NBTE) granted RIVCAS permission to offer courses leading to award of the National Diploma (ND). RIVCAS thus became a polytechnic funded by Rivers State government and supervised by the NBTE. In June 2016, the Rivers State House of Assembly passed a bill renaming the Rivers State College of Arts and Science to Port Harcourt Polytechnic. The Governor of Rivers State, Chief (Barrister) Nyesom Ezenwo Wike CON, signed the Port Harcourt Polytechnic Bill into law on 4 July 2016. The Port Harcourt Polytechnic Law 2016 governs the Elechi Amadi Polytechnic.

Departments

Academic departments
The schools, institutes and polytechnic departments are as follows:

Schools and institutes
 Business and Administration Studies
 Continuing Education (Institute)
 Engineering Technology
 Environmental Science
 Financial Studies
 Foundation and General Studies
 Information and Communication Technology
 Legal and Global Studies (Institute)
 Science and Technology

Departments
 Accountancy
 Agricultural Technology
 Architectural Technology
 Building Technology
 Business Administration and Management
 Computer Engineering
 Computer Science
 Electrical/Electronic Engineering Technology
 Foundation Studies
 General Studies
 Law
 Library and Information Science
 Marketing
 Mass Communication
 Office Technology and Management
 Public Administration
 Science Laboratory Technology
 Statistics
 Surveying and Geo-Informatics
 Urban and Regional Planning

See also
 List of polytechnics in Nigeria
Education in Nigeria

References

External links

Educational institutions established in 1987
Universities and colleges in Port Harcourt
Polytechnics in Nigeria
Science schools in Rivers State
1987 establishments in Nigeria
1980s establishments in Rivers State
Public universities in Nigeria